Obed Cétoute (born January 7, 1983) is a former Canadian football wide receiver. He was drafted in the fourth round with the 31st pick in the 2006 CFL Draft by the Toronto Argonauts and signed with the team on May 27, 2007. 

Cétoute played college football at Central Michigan, and before that at Vanier College for the Cheetahs. 

Cétoute was traded to the Roughriders on June 6, 2010, in exchange for non-import Offensive Lineman Jonathan St. Pierre. Cétoute was released by the Riders on August 9, 2011.

References

External links
Saskatchewan Roughriders bio
Toronto Argonauts bio 

1983 births
Living people
Black Canadian players of Canadian football
Canadian football wide receivers
Haitian Quebecers
Central Michigan Chippewas football players
Canadian football people from Montreal
Players of Canadian football from Quebec
Saskatchewan Roughriders players
Toronto Argonauts players